The Women's United States Squash Open 2016 is the women's edition of the 2016 United States Open (squash), which is a WSA World Series event (prize money: $150 000). The event took place at the Daskalakis Athletic Center in Philadelphia, Pennsylvania in the United States from the 8th of October to the 15th of October. Camille Serme won her first US Open trophy, beating Nour El Sherbini in the final.

Prize money and ranking points
For 2016, the prize purse was $150,000. The prize money and points breakdown is as follows:

Seeds

Draw and results

See also
United States Open (squash)
2016–17 PSA World Series
Men's United States Open (squash) 2016

References

External links
PSA US Open 2016website
US Squash Open official website

Women's US Open
Women's US Open
2016 in American sports
Squash tournaments in the United States
2016 in women's squash
Squash in Pennsylvania